Adolfo Heisinger (30 May 1898 – 31 October 1976) was an Argentine footballer. He played in six matches for the Argentina national football team from 1916 to 1922. He was also part of Argentina's squad for the 1916 South American Championship.

References

External links
 

1898 births
1976 deaths
Argentine footballers
Argentina international footballers
Place of birth missing
Association football defenders
Club Atlético Tigre footballers